"Silver Bird" is a song written by Kenny Young and Artie Butler and recorded by Mark Lindsay, in his solo career after Paul Revere and the Raiders.

Background
"Silver Bird' was recorded along with L.A. session musicians from the Wrecking Crew in 1969.

Chart performance
The single reached number 25 on the U.S. Billboard Hot 100 during the summer of 1970. In Canada, "Silver Bird" peaked at number 10.

Weekly charts

Year-end charts

Popular culture
Yamaha used the music from "Silver Bird", with rewritten lyrics, as the background to at least one of its early 1970s motorcycle commercials.

The 2022 Netflix movie The Gray Man, starring Ryan Gosling, features the song.

References

External links
 

1970 songs
1970 singles
Mark Lindsay songs
Songs written by Kenny Young
Columbia Records singles